is a private university in Ōtawara, Tochigi, Japan, established in 1995.

Campuses

Ohtawara Campus in Tochigi Prefecture
 School of Health Sciences
 School of Health and Welfare
 School of Pharmacy

Narita Campus in Chiba Prefecture
 School of Nursing at Narita
 School of Health Sciences at Narita
 School of Medicine

Odawara Campus in Kanagawa Prefecture
 School of Health Sciences at Odawara

Fukuoka Campus in Fukuoka Prefecture
 School of Nursing at Fukuoka

Okawa Campus in Fukuoka Prefecture
 School of Health Sciences at Fukuoka

External links

 Official website
 Official website (Ohtawara Campus)
 Official website (Narita Campus)
 Official website (School of Medicine)

Educational institutions established in 1995
Private universities and colleges in Japan
Universities and colleges in Tochigi Prefecture
1995 establishments in Japan
Ōtawara